Vladikavkaz (Buro), formerly known as Ordzhonikidze and Dzaudzhikau, is the capital city of the North Ossetia-Alania, Russia. It is located in the southeast of the republic at the foothills of the Caucasus Mountains, situated on the Terek River. The city's population was 311,693 as of the 2010 Census. As a result, Vladikavkaz is one of the most populous cities in the North Caucasus region.

The city is an industrial and transportation centre. Manufactured products include processed zinc and lead, machinery, chemicals, clothing and food products.

Etymology 

The Russian-language name Vladikavkaz literally means "ruler of the Caucasus".
The Ossetian name Dzæwdžyqæw literally means " settlement").

In 1911,  wrote that the Ossetians prove that fortress was founded on the site of the Ingush village Zaur by the name of Vladikavkaz in the Ossetian language:

History 
The city was founded in 1784 as a Russian fortress at the entrance to the Darial Gorge on the site of the Ingush village Zaur, which had the purpose of serving as an outpost for the routes of communication between Russia and Georgia. The Georgian Military Highway, crossing the mountains, was constructed in 1799 to link the city with Georgia to the south, and in 1875 a railway was built to connect it to Rostov-on-Don and Baku in Azerbaijan. Vladikavkaz has become an important industrial centre for the region, with smelting, refining, chemicals and manufacturing industries. During the Russian Empire, the settlement was the administrative capital of the Vladikavkazsky Okrug of the Terek Oblast.

The city is one of the largest in the Russian-controlled Caucasus, along with Grozny, and was the capital of the Mountain Autonomous Soviet Socialist Republic, a Soviet Republic established after the annexation of the Mountainous Republic of the North Caucasus. It existed from 1921 to 1924 and comprised most of the modern-day territories of Chechnya, North Ossetia and Kabardino-Balkaria.

Vladikavkaz was fought over in both the Russian Civil War and World War II. In February 1919, the anti-Communist Volunteer Army under General Anton Denikin seized the city, before being expelled by the Red Army in March 1920. In early November 1942, the forces of Nazi Germany tried unsuccessfully to seize the city but were repelled. The Nazis left North Ossetia in January 1943.

On 26 November 2008, Vitaly Karayev, the mayor of Vladikavkaz was killed by an unidentified gunman. On 31 December 2008, his successor, Kazbek Pagiyev, was also killed by unidentified gunmen.

Administrative and municipal status 
Vladikavkaz is the capital of the republic. Within the framework of administrative divisions, it is, together with six rural localities, incorporated as Vladikavkaz City Under Republic Jurisdiction—an administrative unit with the status equal to that of the districts. As a municipal division, Vladikavkaz City Under Republic Jurisdiction is incorporated as Vladikavkaz Urban Okrug.

Transportation 

The city is served by the bus network (marshrutkas). There are also tram (since 1904) and trolleybus (since 1977) networks, plus the main Vladikavkaz railway station.

The city is served by Beslan Airport located about 9 kilometres from the city.

The Georgian Military Road, which is a part of European route E117, starts in Vladikavkaz and it connects the city with the South Caucasus.

Population 
According to the 1917 publication of the Caucasian Calendar, Vladikavkaz had 73,243 residents in 1916, the national composition was as follows:

According to the results of the 2010 Census, the city population of Vladikavkaz was 330,148. The ethnic makeup of city's population was:
Ossetians: 210,104 (63.9%)
Russians: 80,945 (24.5%)
Armenians: 11,697 (3.5%)
Georgians: 7,014 (2.2%)
Ingush: 3,225 (1.1%)
Azerbaijanis: 2,212 (0.7%)
Ukrainians: 1,857 (0.6%)
Greeks: 1,819 (0.5%)
Slovaks: 990 (0.3%)
Others: 10,285 (3.1%)

Sports 
FC Spartak Vladikavkaz was an association football club based in Vladikavkaz, which won the Russian Premier League in 1995. The club folded in 2020, and was succeeded by FC Alania Vladikavkaz.

Vladikavkaz is home to one of the World's most prestigious Freestyle Wrestling academies, opened in February 2016:  The Wrestling Academy of Aslan Khadartsev - the biggest wrestling academy in the South of Russia.  It provides access to a number of facilities including a swimming pool, sauna, gym, personal dietitians, dorm rooms (which include a TV, comfortable beds, wardrobes, en-suite bathroom and showers), for 45 athletes and the main training hall, consisting of six mats- this academy is capable of hosting 250 wrestlers at one time.  There have been many Olympic, World and European champions training at the Academy: Soslan Ramonov, Zaurbek Sidakov, Artur Naifonov, Chermen Valiev, Khetag Tsabolov are just some of the successful athletes in recent times to train and represent the Academy.  This academy is also home to the Freestyle team of North Ossetia, to ensure a high-level of preparation and coaching is given to aid success in international and domestic tournaments.

Notable structures 

The Mukhtarov Mosque, built in 1906, dominates the city. 

Education

Higher education 
 Highlanders State Agrarian University
 North Caucasus University of Mining and Metallurgy
 North Ossetian State University
 North Ossetian State Medical Academy

Religion 

The city's primary religion is Eastern Orthodox Christianity, which is followed by the majority of Ossetians, Russians and Georgians. The rest of the Ossetian population adheres to the next largest religion, Uatsdin, an Ossetian folk religion, which nationwide is followed by 29% of the population. The remainder follow Protestantism, Islam, Armenian Orthodoxy and other beliefs.

Twin towns and sister cities 

Vladikavkaz is twinned with:

 Ardahan, Turkey
 Asheville, North Carolina, United States
 Kardzhali, Bulgaria
 Nalchik, Russia
 Makhachkala, Russia
 Vladivostok, Russia

Geography

Climate 
Vladikavkaz experiences a humid continental climate (Köppen climate classification Dfb) with warm, wet summers and cold, drier winters (though very mild for Russia).

Notable people 
Nikolai Baratov (1865-1932), Cossack ataman and Imperial Russian Army General during WWI and the Russian Civil War.
Lyubov Streicher (1888-1958), composer and founding member of the Society for Jewish Folk Music
Alexander Kemurdzhian (1921–2003), Soviet mechanical engineer, best known for designing Lunokhod 1, the first ever planetary rover for space exploration
Norat Ter-Grigoryants (born 1936), Soviet and Armenian general, prominent in his role in the First Nagorno-Karabakh War
David Baev (born 1997) – World champion freestyle wrestler
Svitlana Bilyayeva (born 1946) – archaeologist
Stanislav Buchnev (born 1990) – Russian-Armenian footballer, member of the Armenia national football team
Lado Davidov (1924–1987) – Soviet soldier, Hero of the Soviet Union
Murat Gassiev (born 1993) – professional boxer, undefeated unified cruiserweight world champion
Valery Gazzaev (born 1954) – Russian football manager and former footballer
Valery Gergiev (born 1953) – Russian conductor and opera company director
Kazbek Hudalov (born 1959) – Soviet soldier
Ilia II of Georgia (born 1933) – Catholicos-Patriarch of All Georgia and the spiritual leader of the Georgian Orthodox Church
Vitaly Kaloyev (born 1956) – convicted murderer and former architect
Aslan Karatsev (born 1993) – Russian tennis player
Safarbek Malsagov (1868–1944) Russian general
Issa Pliyev (1903–1979) – Soviet military commander, twice Hero of the Soviet Union
Vyacheslav Voronin (born 1974) – Russian high jumper, gold medallist at the 1999 World Championships in Athletics

Notes

References

Bibliography

External links

Vladikavkaz official site 

 
Terek Oblast
Populated places established in 1784
1784 establishments in the Russian Empire
Cities and towns in North Ossetia–Alania